Aspergillus falconensis is a species of fungus in the genus Aspergillus. It is from the Nidulantes section. The species was first described in 1989. It has been reported to produce 3,30-Dihydroxy-5,50-dimethyldiphenyl ether, falconensin A-N, falconenson A-B, hopane-6α,7β,22-triol, hopane-7β,22-diol, mitorubrin, monomethyldihydromitorubrin, monomethylmitorubrin, and zeorin.

Growth and morphology

A. falconensis has been cultivated on both Czapek yeast extract agar (CYA) plates and Malt Extract Agar Oxoid® (MEAOX) plates. The growth morphology of the colonies can be seen in the pictures below.

References 

falconensis
Fungi described in 1989